Odoric of Pordenone, OFM (1286–1331), also known as Odorico Mattiussi/Mattiuzzi, Odoricus of Friuli or Orderic of Pordenone, was an Italian late-medieval Franciscan friar and missionary explorer. He traveled through India, the Greater Sunda Islands, and China, where he spent three years in Beijing. After his death, he became an object of popular devotion and was beatified in 1755.

Odoric wrote a narrative of his travels, which has been preserved in Latin, French, and Italian manuscripts. It includes accurate descriptions of Asian social and religious customs. His account was an important source for the account of John Mandeville. Many of the incredible reports in Mandeville have proven to be garbled versions of Odoric's eyewitness descriptions.

Life

Odoric was born at Villanova, a hamlet now belonging to the town of Pordenone in Friuli, in or about 1286. He came from the Italian family of the Mattiussi, one of the families in charge of defending the town of Pordenone in the name of Ottokar II, King of Bohemia. Otto Hartig, writing in the Catholic Encyclopedia, says his family was Czech. Andrea Tilatti, in Treccani, says this is unsubstantiated.

According to the ecclesiastical biographers, in early years he took the vows of the Franciscan order and joined their convent at Udine, the capital of Friuli. In 1296 Odoric went as a missionary to the Balkans, and then to the Mongols in southern Russia.

Odoric was dispatched to the East in April 1318. Starting from Padua, he went to Constantinople via Venice and then crossed the Black Sea to Trebizond. From there he traveled and preached in Armenia, Media, and Persia. In all these countries the Franciscans had founded mission centers. From Sultanieh he proceeded by Kashan and Yazd, and turning thence followed a somewhat indirect route by Persepolis and the Shiraz and Baghdad regions, to the Persian Gulf. With another friar, James of Ireland, as his companion, he sailed from Ormus to India, landing at Thane, near Mumbai.

At this city St Thomas of Tolentino and his three Franciscan companions had recently been martyred for "blaspheming" Muhammad before the local qadi during a domestic violence case. Their remains had been gathered by Jordan of Severac, a Dominican who had left them a short time before and who later became the first Catholic bishop in India. He interred them at the church in Supera, near Vasai, about 26 miles north of Mumbai. Odoric relates that he disinterred these relics and carried them with him on his further travels. From Thane, he travelled down the Malabar coast, stopping at Kodungallur and Quilon. From there, he proceeded around Cape Comorin to the Coromandel Coast. Here, he visited the Church of St. Thomas. He also visited Puri, giving one of the earliest accounts of the Chariot Festival of the Hindu God Jagannath to the western world. In his own account of 1321, Odoric reported how the people put the "idols" on chariots, and the King and Queen and all the people drew them from the "church" with song and music.

From India, Odoric sailed in a junk to Sumatra, visiting various ports on the northern coast of that island. Thence, he visited Java, Borneo, Champa, via Great Nicobar Island. An account on the official site of the Apostolic Vicariate of Brunei Darussalam stated that he travelled Borneo, and probably came to Brunei, in 1325. He travelled from Ceylon to Guangzhou (which he knew as "Chin-Kalan" or "Mahachin"). From Guangzhou, he travelled overland to the great port of Quanzhou ("Zayton") where there were two houses of his order. In one of these, he deposited most of the remains of the Four Martyrs of Thane, although he continued to carry St Thomas's head until he delivered it to the Franciscans of the martyr's hometown of Tolentino.

From Fuzhou Odoric struck across the mountains into Zhejiang and visited Hangzhou ("Cansay"). It was at the time one of the great cities of the world and Odoric —like Marco Polo, Marignolli, and Ibn Batuta—gives details of its splendors. He mentions Hangzhou as "greater city than any other in the world, being 100 miles around, with everywhere within inhabited; often a house has 10 or 12 families. The city has twelve gates and at each gate at about eight miles are cities larger than Venice or Padua". Passing northward by Nanjing and crossing the Yangzi, Odoric embarked on the Grand Canal and travelled to the headquarters of the Great Khan (probably Yesün Temür Khan) at Khanbaliq (within present-day Beijing). He remained there for three years, probably from 1324 to 1327. He was attached, no doubt, to one of the churches founded by the Franciscan Archbishop John of Monte Corvino, at this time in extreme old age. He also visited Yangzhou where Katarina Vilioni's tombstone was found in 1951.

Odoric did not return to Italy till the end of 1329 or the beginning of 1330; but, as regards intermediate dates, all that we can deduce from his narrative or other evidence is that he was in western India soon after 1321 (pretty certainly in 1322) and that he spent three years in China between the opening of 1323 and the close of 1328. On one of his trips, his ship was nearly capsized by a typhoon but they landed safely in Bolinao, Pangasinan, Philippines. He is said to have held a Mass there, in around 1324. That would have pre-dated the Mass celebrated in 1521 by Pedro de Valderrama for the crew of Magellan's circumnavigation, which is generally regarded as the first Mass in the Philippines, by some 197 years. However, historian William Henry Scott concluded after examining Odoric's writings about his travels that he likely never set foot on Philippine soil and, if he did, there is no reason to think that he celebrated Mass.

Odoric's return voyage is less clearly described. Returning overland across Asia, through the Land of Prester John (possibly Mongolia), and through Casan, the adventurous traveller seems to have entered Tibet, and even perhaps to have visited Lhasa. After this we trace the friar in northern Persia, in what he calls "Millestorte", once famous as the Land of the Assassins, i.e. the Rudbar of Alamut. No further indications of his homeward route (to Venice) are given, though it is almost certain that he passed through Tabriz. The vague and fragmentary character of the narrative, in this section,  forcibly contrasts with the clear and careful tracing of the outward way.

During a part at least of these long journeys the companion of Odoric was James of Ireland, an Irishman, as appears from a record in the public books of Udine, showing that shortly after Odoric's death a present of two marks was made to this Irish friar, Socio beau Fratris Odorici, amore Dei et Odorici. Shortly after his return Odoric betook himself to the Minorite house attached to the Friary of St. Anthony at Padua, and it was there that in May 1330 he related the story of his travels, which was taken down in homely Latin by Friar William of Solagna.

Travelling towards the papal court at Avignon, Odoric fell ill at Pisa, and turning back to Udine, the capital of his native province, died there.

Odoric in context

Odoric's journey is perhaps best seen as a diplomatic mission, in addition to its religious dimensions. Nearly a century earlier, Mongols had entered Europe itself in the Mongol invasion of Europe. Between 1237 and 1238 they pillaged most of Russia, and by 1241 they had devastated Poland and Hungary. Then they suddenly retreated. At the First Council of Lyon, Pope Innocent IV organized the first missions to the Great Khan Tartary in 1245, entrusted to the Franciscans, as were subsequent Papal missions over the next century. Niccolò, Matteo, and Marco Polo made two voyages in 1260 and 1271, and in 1294 the missionary John of Monte Corvino made a similar journey for Pope Nicholas IV.

Contemporary fame of his journeys

The fame of his vast journeys appears to have made a much greater impression on the laity of his native territory than on his Franciscan brethren. The latter were about to bury him—without delay or ceremony, but the gastald or chief magistrate of the city interfered and appointed a public funeral; rumours of his wondrous travels and of posthumous miracles were diffused, and excitement spread like wildfire over Friuli and Carniola; the ceremony had to be deferred more than once, and at last took place in presence of the patriarch of Aquileia and all the local dignitaries. Popular acclamation made him an object of devotion, the municipality erected a noble shrine for his body, and his fame as saint and traveller had spread far and wide before the middle of the century, but it was not till four centuries later (1755) that the papal authority formally sanctioned his beatification. A bust of Odoric was set up at Pordenone in 1881.

There are a few passages in the book that stamp Odoric as a genuine and original traveller. He is the first European, after Marco Polo, who distinctly mentions the name of Sumatra. The cannibalism and community of wives which he attributes to certain people of that island do certainly belong to it, or to islands closely adjoining. His description of sago in the archipelago is not free from errors, but they are the errors of an eye-witness.

Regarding China, his mention of Guangzhou by the name of Censcolam or Censcalam (Chin-Kalan), and his descriptions of the custom of fishing with tame cormorants, of the habit of letting the fingernails grow extravagantly, and of the compression of women's feet, are peculiar to him among the travellers of that age; Marco Polo omits them all. Odoric was one who not only visited many countries, but wrote about them so that he could share his knowledge with others.

Beatification

Moved by the many miracles that were wrought at the tomb of the Odoric, Pope Benedict XIV, in the year 1755, approved the veneration which had been paid to Blessed Odoric. In the year 1881 the city of Pordenone erected a magnificent memorial to its distinguished son.

Manuscripts and published editions

Seventy-three manuscripts of Odoric's narrative are known to exist in Latin, French and Italian: of these the chief, of about 1350, is in the Bibliothèque Nationale de France, Paris (Manuscripts lat. 2584, fols. 118 r. to 127 v.. The narrative was first printed at Pesaro in 1513, in what Apostolo Zeno (1668–1750) calls lingua inculta e rozza.

Giovanni Battista Ramusio first includes Odoric's narrative in the second volume of the second edition (1574) (Italian version), in which are given two versions, differing curiously from one another, but without any prefatory matter or explanation. (See also edition of 1583, vol. ii. fols. 245 r256 r.) Another (Latin) version is given in the Acta Sanctorum (Bollandist) under 14 January. The curious discussion before the papal court respecting the beatification of Odoric forms a kind of blue-book issued ex typographia rev. camerae apostolicae (Rome, 1755). Friedrich Kunstmann of Munich devoted one of his papers to Odoric's narrative (Histor.-polit. Blätter von Phillips und Görres, vol. xxxvii. pp. 507–537).

Some editions of Odoric are:

Giuseppe Venni, Elogio storico alle gesta del Beato Odorico (Venice, 1761)
Henry Yule in Cathay and the Way Thither, vol. i. pp. 1–162, vol. ii. appendix, pp. 1–42 (London, 1866), Hakluyt Society
Henri Cordier, Les Voyages ... du frère Odoric ... (Paris, 1891) (edition of Old French version of c. 1350). Available at the Internet Archive
Teofilo Domenichelli, Sopra la vita e i viaggi del Beato Odorico da Pordenone dell'ordine de'minori (Prato, 1881) (includes a Latin and an Italian text) (available at the Internet Archive)
text embedded in the Storia universale delle Missione Francescane, by Marcellino da Civezza, iii. 739-781
text embedded in Richard Hakluyt's Principal Navigations (1599), ii. 39-67.
John of Viktring (Johannes Victoriensis) in Fontes rerum Germanicarum, ed. JF Böhmer
Luke Wadding, Annales Minorum, A.D. 1331, vol. vii. pp. 123–126
Bartholomew Rinonico, Opus conformitatum ... B. Francisci ..., bk. i. par. ii. conf. 8 (fol. 124 of Milan, edition of 1513)
John of Winterthur in Eccard, Corpus historicum medii aevi, vol. i. cols. 1894-1897, especially 1894
CR Beazley, Dawn of Modern Geography, iii. 250-287, 548-549, 554, 565-566, 612-613.

Legacy
Minor planet 4637 Odorico is named after him.

See also
Chronology of European exploration of Asia
Roman Catholicism in China
John of Montecorvino
Rabban Bar Sauma

References

Citations

Bibliography

 Dāsa, J. P. (1982). Puri paintings: The chitrakāra and his work. Atlantic Highlands, N.J: Humanities Press.
 Mitter, P. (1977). Much maligned monsters: History of European reactions to Indian art. Oxford: Clarendon Press.
 Starza, O. M. (1993). The Jagannatha Temple at Puri: Its architecture, art, and cult. Leiden: E.J. Brill.

Popular translations
Odoric of Pordenone, translation by Sir Henry Yule, introduction by Paolo Chiesa, The Travels of Friar Odoric: 14th Century Journal of the Blessed Odoric of Pordenone, Eerdmans (December 15, 2001), hardcover, 174 pages,  . Scan at Archive.org.

Further reading
BRESSAN, L.. 1997. “ODORIC OF PORDENONE (1265-1331). His Vision of China and South-east Asia and His Contribution to Relations Between Asia and Europe”. Journal of the Malaysian Branch of the Royal Asiatic Society 70 (2 (273)). Malaysian Branch of the Royal Asiatic Society: 1–23. https://www.jstor.org/stable/41493334.

External links
 Viaggio del beato odoricl da vdine (Odoric travels) (1583) translated to Italian by Giovanni Battista Ramusio.

1286 births
1331 deaths
People from Pordenone
14th-century explorers
14th-century Italian writers
Italian Friars Minor
14th-century Italian Roman Catholic priests
Franciscan missionaries
Italian Roman Catholic missionaries
Italian explorers
Explorers of Asia
Medieval travel writers
Roman Catholic missionaries in China
Roman Catholic missionaries in Tibet
Franciscan beatified people
Italian beatified people
14th century in China
Burials in the Province of Udine